Alpo Kullervo Marttinen (4 November 1908 – 20 December 1975) was a Finnish-American colonel. During World War II he served in the Finnish Army. Following the war he immigrated to the United States and served as an officer in the United States Army, retiring as a colonel.

Marttinen was one of the key figures in the Weapons Cache Case where a large number of Finnish Army weapons were hidden around the country in case of a Soviet invasion. Soldiers involved in this case were forced to leave Finland since hiding weapons was a criminal act due to the 1944 Moscow Armistice. These soldiers, who mostly fled to United States and enlisted in the US Army, were later called as "Marttinen's men".

Marttinen first fled to Sweden in 1945 with the help of his former subordinate officer Harry Järv. A year later Marttinen and his family moved to the United States, where he was given citizenship in 1951. He served in the US Army from 1947 to 1968, first as a specialist and instructor of winter warfare and later as a General Staff Officer in the United States, West Germany, and South Korea. Marttinen spent the last three years of his career as a Military advisor in Iran. He also was a graduate of the US Army Command and General Staff College (1950) and the US Army War College (1963).

Marttinen died on the 20th of December, 1975, at Falls Church, Virginia, and was buried at Fort Leavenworth National Cemetery. He had three sons. His oldest, Pekka Marttinen (1933–1958), served as a lieutenant in the 2nd U.S. Cavalry Regiment and was killed in a gunnery explosion in Grafenwöhr, Germany.

Awards 
Finland:
Mannerheim Cross
United States:
Legion of Merit
Army Commendation Medal
Army Good Conduct Medal
National Defense Service Medal

References

Further reading
  
 

1908 births
1975 deaths
People from Tornio
People from Oulu Province (Grand Duchy of Finland)
Finnish military personnel of World War II
Knights of the Mannerheim Cross
Finnish emigrants to the United States
United States Army colonels
United States Army Command and General Staff College alumni
Officers of the Legion of Merit